Our Lady of Lourdes School is a secondary school located in Ballymoney, County Antrim, Northern Ireland.

Academics
The school offers the full range of subjects at both GCSE and A-Level. It partners with the neighbouring Ballymoney High School and Dalriada School in the conduct of projects and the delivery of certain subjects.

Extra curriculum
The school provides the opportunity to participate in a full range of sports including hurling, Netball, Gaelic Football, Soccer, Camogie, Athletics, Table tennis, Hockey and Rugby.  It also offers various arts activities including Music, Dance, Drama, Glee Choir, Irish Dancing.

Inspection

The standard inspection of the school by the Education and Training Inspectorate in 2015 found the school's Overall Effectiveness to have a high level of capacity for sustained improvement, and Achievements and standards, Provision for learning and Leadership and management all to be Very Good. The report described the school's performance in GCSE English language, history and mathematics at grades A*-C as significantly above average and the standards in GCSE English language as outstanding.

References

Secondary schools in County Antrim
Catholic secondary schools in Northern Ireland
Civil parish of Ballymoney

1964 establishments in Northern Ireland
Educational institutions established in 1964